Peaked Mountain Lake is a lake located northeast of Stillwater, New York. The outflow creek flows into Stillwater Reservoir. Fish species present in the lake are brown bullhead, and brook trout. Access via bushwhack trail from evergreen lake trail. No motors are allowed on Peaked Mountain Lake.

References

Lakes of Herkimer County, New York